Callistochroma viridipennis is a species of long-horned beetle in the family Cerambycidae. It was described by Pierre André Latreille in 1811.

References

Further reading

 

Trachyderini
Beetles described in 1811